College 1975 F.C. is an association football team from Gibraltar. Originally formed in 1975, they currently play in the Gibraltar National League.

History
Formed in 1975, College spent the majority of their existence moving between the top two divisions in Gibraltar, with second and third teams playing elsewhere in the pyramid. During this time, they went through several variations of their name, most notably College Cosmos, before entering into a partnership with the reforming Europa in 2013, bring in extra resources as the Gibraltar Football Association joined UEFA. This saw an immediate upturn in results, and saw College Europa qualify for the UEFA Europa League at the first attempt via the 2014 Rock Cup. However, in 2015 the partnership between the two sides ended, and while the newly independent Europa retained their place in the Gibraltar Premier Division, the Dolphins, now calling themselves College 1975, were forced to start anew in the Gibraltar Second Division.

Since the split, the side largely constructed by player-manager Nolan Bosio competed in the Second Division, reaching the final of the Second Division Cup in 2017, until the two divisions in Gibraltar merged in 2019. With a new management brought in under chairman Joseph Mir, a large scale rebuild of the squad took place, including the establishment of an under-23 side for the Gibraltar Intermediate League. Despite this, the side struggled on their return to the top flight, picking up a solitary point in a 5–5 draw with Europa Point, in their final match before the season was abandoned.

Current squad

First team

Intermediate team

Club staff

Seasons
Seasons since joining UEFA only.

Club records
Records since joining UEFA only.
Gibraltar Premier Cup: 2014–15 (as College Europa)
Best league finish - 2nd, Gibraltar Premier Division: 2014–15 (as College Europa)
Best Rock Cup performance - Runners-Up: 2014
Best Second Division Cup performance - Runners up: 2017

References

External links 
 College 1975 on Facebook
 Page at 5point4sports.com

Football clubs in Gibraltar
Gibraltar National League clubs
2013 establishments in Gibraltar
Association football clubs established in 2013